Włodzimierz Zagórski may refer to:

 Włodzimierz Zagórski (general) (1882–1927), Polish general
 Włodzimierz Zagórski (writer) (1834–1902), Polish writer, satirist; pseudonymes Chochlik, Publikola